Rachel Abbott (the pen name of Sheila Rodgers; born 1952) is a British author of psychological thrillers. A self-publisher, her first seven novels (and one novella) have combined to sell over three million copies, and have all been bestsellers on Amazon's Kindle store. In 2015, she was named the 14th bestselling author over the last five years on Amazon's Kindle in the UK.

Early life
Abbott grew up near Manchester, England. She worked as a systems analyst, and then founded an interactive media company, developing software and websites for the education market. She sold the company for around £5 million in 2000. Following the sale, she moved from Lancashire, England, to Italy, where she restored a 15th-century Italian monastery that for a time she and her husband operated as a venue for weddings and holidays.

Career
In 2009, Abbott decided to write a book about an average, everyday woman put into a situation where she had no other option but to commit murder. It took Abbott 18 months to write the first draft. In November 2011, after it was rejected by several literary agents, Abbott, then 59, published her first novel, Only the Innocent, on Amazon, under her pen name. The book sold slowly at first, with sales taking off after Abbott put together a strong marketing campaign.

Abbott followed up Only the Innocent in 2013 with The Back Road and in 2014 with Sleep Tight. Her fourth novel, Stranger Child, was published on 24 February 2015. Later that year, she published the novella Nowhere Child, which has the same characters as Stranger Child. In 2016, she published her sixth novel, Kill Me Again. Her five novels and one novella all focus on relationships and crime, and all feature the same detective, Chief Inspector Tom Douglas. Abbott has described the character as "a genuinely honest, nice guy who just seems to be attracted to the wrong women."

Working with an agent since 2012, she published in the UK, and through a publisher in North America. Her books have been translated into seven different languages.

By 2015, Abbott's first three novels, all published in the UK, with the first two published by Thomas & Mercer in the US, had combined to sell one million copies. All three have been bestsellers in Amazon's Kindle store. By March 2016, she had sold two million books. In 2015, Abbott was named Amazon's most popular independently published author in the UK; she is Amazon's number one e-book seller in crime and thriller writing. Also in 2015, she was named the 14th bestselling author over the last five years on Amazon's Kindle in the UK, after first publishing on the platform in 2011. For the year 2015 (through August), Stranger Child was the most borrowed book from Amazon UK's Kindle Owners' Lending Library service, and number 11 on Amazon UK's list of best-selling eBooks of 2015.

In 2017, The Express called her the "Queen of the twisted suspense novel." That year, following a five-way auction, Abbott signed a two-book deal with Headline Publishing Group to become a "hybrid author". The first book in the deal is And So It Begins, a psychological thriller that asks if there can ever be a proper defence for murder. It introduced a new character, Sergeant Stephanie King, and will be published later in 2018.

Abbott was invited to be a judge for Amazon's inaugural Kindle Storyteller Award in 2017 alongside model and actress Lily Cole and the Alliance of Independent Authors founder Orna Ross.

In 2018, Abbott published her seventh novel, Come A Little Closer. As of 2021, Abbott has sold over 4 million copies of her books worldwide.

Personal life
Abbott and her husband divide their time between the Le Marche region of Italy and the island of Alderney, one of the Channel Islands.

Bibliography

References

External links
Official website
Official blog

English women novelists
1952 births
Living people
English thriller writers
English crime fiction writers
Writers from Manchester
People from le Marche
People from Alderney
Women thriller writers
20th-century English writers
20th-century English women writers
21st-century English writers
21st-century English women writers
20th-century pseudonymous writers
21st-century pseudonymous writers
Pseudonymous women writers